Sobrelapeña is a small village in the far north of Spain in the province of Cantabria. It is located in the municipality of Lamasón, and has a population of 53.

Towns in Spain
Municipalities in Cantabria